Leonardo Levato (died 1533) was a Roman Catholic prelate who served as Bishop of Belcastro (1518–1533).

On 23 August 1518, Leonardo Levato was appointed during the papacy of Pope Leo X as Bishop of Belcastro.
He served as Bishop of Belcastro until his death in 1533.

References

External links and additional sources
 (for Chronology of Bishops) 
 (for Chronology of Bishops) 

16th-century Italian Roman Catholic bishops
Bishops appointed by Pope Leo X
1533 deaths